Beresford Park was a former football stadium in town of Ayr in Scotland. The ground was the former home of Scottish Football League teams Ayr FC and Ayr Parkhouse before their merger to form Ayr United FC. The ground was located in the centre of the town, adjacent to Burns statue square, where the current Odeon cinema stands. Parkhouse street and Beresford Terrace now stand on the former site of the stadium named after Ayr Parkhouse FC, former tenants of the ground and the ground itself respectively.

Ayr FC
Ayr FC moved to Beresford Park from Springvale Park in 1884 where they stayed until 1888, when they moved to Somerset Park, current home of Ayr United, taking the grandstand and clubhouse with them. Ayr FC moved from Beresford Park as the Annual Ayr Cattle Show, that was hosted at Beresford Park had been booked earlier than usual, clashing with the clubs clash with the FA Cup holders Aston Villa.

Ayr Parkhouse FC
When Ayr FC moved to Somerset Park, Ayr Parkhouse FC moved from their home at the "Old Racecourse" in the Seafield area of the town. Ayr Parkhouse FC remained at Beresford Park until the merger with Ayr FC in 1910.

References

Ayr United F.C.
Sports venues in Ayr
Defunct football venues in Scotland
Scottish Football League venues
Sports venues completed in 1884
Sports venues demolished in 1926
Demolished sports venues in the United Kingdom